Indoor athletics has been contested at every Asian Indoor Games and Asian Indoor and Martial Arts Games since the inaugural games at the 2005 Asian Indoor Games, except the first combined games at the 2013 Asian Indoor and Martial Arts Games. The programme includes track and field events in 26 events (17 events each).  The World Athletics and Asian Athletics Association are the world and continental respectively governing body.

Editions
There are five Asian Indoor Games and Asian Indoor and Martial Arts Games that indoor athletics competed. The 2013 Asian Indoor and Martial Arts Games in Incheon, South Korea was only the games that excluded indoor athletics.

Events

Men's events

Women's events

Nations

Medal table
Updated after the 2017 Asian Indoor and Martial Arts Games

See also
 List of Asian Indoor and Martial Arts Games records in indoor athletics
 Asian Indoor Championships in Athletics

References

External links
Athletics, Indoor (Olympic Council of Asia) 
World Athletics 
Asian Athletics Association

 
Asian Indoor and Martial Arts Games
Sports at the Asian Indoor and Martial Arts Games
Athletics in Asia